The Taipei Metro Sanhe Junior High School station is a station on the Luzhou Line located in Sanchong District, New Taipei, Taiwan. The station is opened for service on 3 November 2010.

Station overview
This two-level, underground station has an island platform and is located at the intersection of Sanhe Rd., Sec. 4 and Ziqiang Rd. The station opened for service in November 2010 with the opening of the Luzhou Branch Line.

Construction
Excavation depth for this station is 18.5 meters. It is 213.7 meters in length and 18.5 meters wide. It has two entrances, one emergency exit, one accessibility elevator, and two vent shafts.

Station Design
The theme for the station is "Standing on One Leg on a Sandbank", as part of a common theme of egrets for the Luzhou Line.

Station layout

Exits
Exit 1: Sanhe Junior High School 
Exit 2: Sanhe Rd. Sec. 4

Around the station
Sanhe Junior High School - exit 2
Haude Police Station (between this station and Sanchong Elementary School station)
Ger Jyh Senior High School

References

Zhonghe–Xinlu line stations
Railway stations opened in 2010